"Rise" is a song by British DJ and music producer Jonas Blue featuring American pop-rap duo Jack & Jack. It was released on 25 May 2018 by Positiva Records and Virgin EMI Records.

The song has peaked at number three on the UK Singles Chart, becoming Blue's fourth UK top 10 hits. It is the sixth single of Blue's debut album Blue. The song is also included on Jack & Jack's debut studio album, A Good Friend Is Nice.

A version featuring a subunit of Korean–Japanese girl group Iz*One, consisting of the half of group's members Choi Ye-na, Lee Chae-yeon, Kim Chae-won, Jo Yu-ri, An Yu-jin and Jang Won-young, was released on 9 March 2019.

Background
Blue first reached out to Jack & Jack after hearing them performing on a Los Angeles radio station.

Music video
The official music video was uploaded to YouTube on 15 June 2018 and was filmed in Lisbon, Portugal. The first section of the video was filmed in the Alfama district of Lisbon. The second part was recorded in the Terreiro dos Radicais Skate Park, near the Ponte Vasco da Gama bridge. The video received a "British Artist Video of the Year" nomination at the 2019 Brit Awards.

Track listings

Charts

Weekly charts

Year-end charts

Certifications

Release history

References

 

2018 singles
2018 songs
2019 singles
Jonas Blue songs
Iz*One songs
Songs written by Romans (musician)
Songs written by Jonas Blue
Songs written by Ed Drewett